State Road 578 (NM 578) is a  state highway in the US state of New Mexico. NM 578's southern terminus is at the end of state maintenance south-southeast of Red River, and the northern terminus is at NM 38 in Red River.

Major intersections

See also

References

578
Transportation in Taos County, New Mexico